Luce County is a county located in the Upper Peninsula in the U.S. state of Michigan. As of the 2020 Census, the population was 5,339, making it the second-least populous county in Michigan (behind Keweenaw County). The county seat is Newberry, Luce County's only incorporated community. The county was set off and organized in 1887 and named after former Michigan Governor Cyrus G. Luce.

In 2002, Newberry was designated as the moose capital of Michigan by the state legislature.

Geography
Luce County is part of the Upper Peninsula of Michigan. It has a northern border with Canada across Lake Superior.

Major highways
 is Michigan's longest state trunkline highway. An east–west route, M-28 can be used to access Sault Ste. Marie to the east, and Munising and Marquette to the west.
 is a north–south connector between M-28 west of Newberry to US 2 in Mackinac County.
 is a u-shaped highway, beginning at M-28 south of Newberry. Motorists also use M-123 to access Tahquamenon Falls and Whitefish Point.

Airport
Luce County Airport (KERY), provides service for the county and surrounding communities.

Adjacent counties
Chippewa County (east)
Mackinac County (south)
Schoolcraft County (southwest)
Alger County (west)
Thunder Bay District, Ontario (north)
Algoma District, Ontario (northeast)

Demographics

The 2010 census indicates Luce County had a population of 6,631. This is a decrease of 393 people from the 2000 United States Census. This is a -5.6% change in population. In 2010 there were 2,412 households and 1,542 families residing in the county.  The population density was 7 people per square mile (3/km2).  There were 4,343 housing units at an average density of 5 per square mile (2/km2).  The racial makeup of the county was 80.4% White, 11.1% Black or African American, 5.0% Native American, 0.3% Asian and 3.1% of two or more races.  1.2% were Hispanic or Latino (of any race). 14.5% were of German, 7.6% French, French Canadian or Cajun, 7.4% Irish, 6.8% English, 6.3% American and 5.5% Finnish ancestry.

There were 2,412 households, out of which 24.3% had children under the age of 18 living with them, 50.2% were married couples living together, 9.3% had a female householder with no husband present, and 36.1% were non-families. 31.4% of all households were made up of individuals, and 13.8% had someone living alone who was 65 years of age or older.  The average household size was 2.25 and the average family size was 2.77.

In the county, the population was spread out, with 17.9% under the age of 18, 7.0% from 18 to 24, 27.5% from 25 to 44, 29.6% from 45 to 64, and 17.9% who were 65 years of age or older.  The median age was 43 years. The population was 57.7% male and 42.3% female.

The median income for a household in the county was $42,083, and the median income for a family was $49,948. The per capita income for the county was $18,294.  About 12.6% of families and 16.3% of the population were below the poverty line, including 27.7% of those under age 18 and 12.5% of those age 65 or over.

Government

The county government operates the jail, maintains rural roads, operates the
major local courts, keeps files of deeds and mortgages, maintains vital records, administers
public health regulations, and participates with the state in the provision of welfare and
other social services. The county board of commissioners controls the
budget but has only limited authority to make laws or ordinances.  In Michigan, most local
government functions — police and fire, building and zoning, tax assessment, street
maintenance, etc. — are the responsibility of individual cities and townships.

Elected officials
 Prosecuting Attorney: Joshua B. Freed
 Sheriff: John Cischke
 County Clerk/Register of Deeds: Sharon J. Price
 County Treasurer: Darlene Kisro

(information as of July 2013)

Communities

Village
Newberry (county seat)

Civil townships
Columbus Township
Lakefield Township
McMillan Township
Pentland Township

Unincorporated communities
 Betty B Landing
 Carpenter Landing
 Danaher
 Deer Park
 Dollarville
 Helmer
 Laketon
 McMillan
 Pine Stump Junction
 Soo Junction

Indian reservations
Luce County contains one very small portion of the Sault Tribe of Chippewa Indians tribal community, which is headquartered in Sault Ste. Marie in Chippewa County.  This small plot of land is located within Pentland Township but is administered autonomously.

See also
 List of Michigan State Historic Sites in Luce County, Michigan
National Register of Historic Places listings in Luce County, Michigan

References

Bibliography

External links
Luce County Official Website
Sam M Cohodas Regional Economist

 
Michigan counties
1887 establishments in Michigan
Populated places established in 1887